Alan Fabrizio Ruiz Preza (born 3 January 2001) is a Mexican professional footballer who plays as a midfielder for Liga MX club Tijuana.

Career statistics

Club

References

External links
 
 
 

Living people
2001 births
Mexican footballers
Association football midfielders
C.D. Veracruz footballers
Club Tijuana footballers
Liga MX players
Footballers from Veracruz
People from Veracruz